The CPR Vaughan Intermodal facility is an intermodal rail-truck terminal serving the Greater Toronto Area from a property adjacent to the Canadian Pacific Railway transcontinental main line on the Mactier Subdivision in the community of Coleraine, Ontario in the City of Vaughan, Ontario.

Operated by CP Rail Intermodal Freight Systems, the facility opened in 1991 on  along Peel Regional Road 50 between Rutherford Road and Major Mackenzie Drive.  It underwent expansion in 2001 and handles  of cargo annually using four electric gantry cranes; it initially handled only  annually.

Tenants on the site include:
 Fastfrate - relocated from CPR West Toronto Yard
 Sears

See also
Canadian Pacific Railway

References

External links
 http://www.cpr.ca/

Rail_yards_in_Ontario
Rail infrastructure in the Regional Municipality of York
Canadian Pacific Railway facilities
Railway freight terminals in Canada
Rail transport in Vaughan